Dirk Krijn Johannes "Dick" Tommel (born 18 April 1942 in Amersfoort) is a former Dutch politician of Democrats 66 (D66).

Tommel was an MP from 1981 to 1994 and State Secretary from 1994 to 1998.

References 
  Parlement.com biography

1942 births
Living people
Democrats 66 politicians
Members of the House of Representatives (Netherlands)
People from Amersfoort
State Secretaries for Housing and Spatial Planning of the Netherlands
Utrecht University alumni